Briaucourt is a commune in the Haute-Saône department in the region of Bourgogne-Franche-Comté in eastern France.

Geography

The Lanterne River flows through the commune. To the South it borders the communes of Velorcey, Abelcourt, Sainte-Marie-en-Chaux, from southeast to southwest, respectively. To the west it borders the communes of Ormoiche and Francalmont. To the east, Conflans-sur-Lanterne. To the north it borders Ainville, and to the northeast, Plainemont. Out of these, two of them are in different cantons, Plainemont, which is in the Canton Port-sur-Saône, and the Commune of Ormoiche, which is in the Canton of Luxeuil-les-Bains.

Notable people
Henri Genaille (October 2, 1856-?) inventor of Genaille-Lucas rulers

Mayors of Briaucourt
Raymond Py (2001-2003, Independent)
Denis Laurent (2003–Present, The Republicans)

See also
Communes of the Haute-Saône department

References

Communes of Haute-Saône